The 2012 World Group II Play-offs were four ties which involved the losing nations of the World Group II and four nations from the three Zonal Group I competitions. Nations that won their play-off ties entered the 2013 World Group II, while losing nations joined their respective zonal groups.

France vs. Slovenia

Switzerland vs. Belarus

Sweden vs. Great Britain

Argentina vs. China

References

See also
Fed Cup structure

World Group II Play-offs